Nasiba Jahangir gizi Zeynalova (20 April 1916 – 10 March 2004) was a Soviet and Azerbaijani actress. People's Artist of Azerbaijan SSR (1967).

Life and career
Nasiba Zeynalova was born in Baku (then part of the Russian Empire, present-day capital of Azerbaijan), the daughter of merchant and stage actor Jahangir Zeynalov. The family fled to Iran just before the Azeri massacre of March 1918 committed by Bolshevik military units in Baku. Her father died during their trip back home in September 1918, via the Caspian Sea.

While in secondary school she attended dance courses. In 1932 she joined Rza Tahmasib's drama club. In 1937 she joined a vagrant theatre troupe and toured several Azerbaijani towns. In 1938 she started working at the Azerbaijan State Academic Theatre of Musical Comedy. She earned a degree at the Baku School of Theatre.

In the following years Nasiba Zeynalova acted in 22 films and around 70 plays, as well as in numerous television sketches. She is most remembered for the roles of Fatmanisa in Ogey ana (Stepmother, 1958), Sughra in Bizim Jabish muallim (Our Teacher Jabish, 1969), Jannat in Gayinana (Mother-in-law, 1978) and Auntie Asli in Beyin ogurlanmasi (The Kidnapping of the Groom, 1985). In 1967, she was named People's Artist of Azerbaijan SSR.

Filmography

Ögey ana (1958)
Mollanın sərgüzəşti (1960)
Böyük dayaq (1962)
Ulduz (1964)
Qanun naminə (1968)
Bizim Cəbiş müəllim (1969)

Dəli Kür (1969)
O qızı tapın (1970)
Bizim küçənin oğlanları (1973)
1001-ci qastrol (1974)
Любовь с первого взгляда (1975)
Xoşbəxtlik qayğıları (1976)

Qayınana (1978)
Mən mahnı bəsləyirəm (1978)
За закрытой дверью (1981)
Не бойся, я с тобой (1981)
Bəyin oğurlanması (1985)
Qəm pəncərəsi (1986)

Xüsusi vəziyyət (1986)Gecə qatarında qətl (1990)Güllələnmə təxirə salınır (1993)Yuxu (1995)Məhəllə'' (2003)

References

1916 births
2004 deaths
20th-century Azerbaijani actresses
21st-century Azerbaijani actresses
Actors from Baku
Honored Artists of the Azerbaijan SSR
People's Artists of Azerbaijan
Recipients of the Order of Friendship of Peoples
Recipients of the Order of the Red Banner of Labour
Recipients of the Shohrat Order
Azerbaijani film actresses
Azerbaijani stage actresses
Soviet Azerbaijani people
Soviet film actresses
Soviet stage actresses
Burials at Alley of Honor